Zachary Roy (born June 24, 2003) is a Canadian soccer player who plays for the Atlético Ottawa of the Canadian Premier League.

Early life 
Roy played youth soccer with CS St-Hubert. In 2019, he played with the Quebec provincial U17 team. He also played in the 2019 Ontario-vs-Quebec CPL U-21 showcase. He attended post-secondary at Champlain College Saint-Lambert, playing for the men's soccer team.

Club career
In 2021, he played for CS St-Hubert in the Première ligue de soccer du Québec, making two appearances, while primarily playing with the Reserve and U21 teams.

In February 2022, he signed a two year contract with a club option for 2024 with Canadian Premier League club Atlético Ottawa. He made his debut on April 16, against HFX Wanderers FC.

Personal
Roy's sister Félicia plays for the Canada women's national under-17 soccer team.

Honours

Atlético Ottawa 
 Canadian Premier League
Regular Season: 2022

References

External links

2003 births
Living people
Association football defenders
Canadian soccer players
Canadian Premier League players
Première ligue de soccer du Québec players
CS St-Hubert players
Atlético Ottawa players